Nitrosomonas oligotropha is an ammonia-oxidizing, aerobe, gram-negative bacterium from the genus of Nitrosomonas which occurs in chloraminated drinking water systems.

References

Nitrosomonadaceae
Bacteria described in 2001